JS Noshiro (FFM-3) is the third ship of the Mogami-class frigate of the Japan Maritime Self-Defense Force (JMSDF). She was named after the Noshiro River and shares her name with a World War II light cruiser Noshiro and Cold War destroyer escort Noshiro.

Development and design 

In 2015 the Japanese defense budget allocated funds to study the construction of a new “compact-type hull destroyer with additional multi-functional capabilities” as well as a new radar system for the destroyer. In the same year Mitsubishi Heavy Industries (MHI) unveiled the frigate's first concept model (30FF) which they have been developing with their own funds.

The 30DX design has an overall length of 133 m, breadth of 16 m, a standard displacement of 3900 tons with a full load displacement of about 5500 tons, and a maximum speed of over 30 knots. Weapons include a Mk 45 gun, two remote weapon station above the bridge, 16 Mk 41 VLS at the bow, 8 anti-ship missiles, one SeaRAM, an SH-60Lhelicopter, torpedoes, and decoy launchers. It can also deploy and recover UUV, USV, and sea mines from the rear ramp beneath the helideck. It is also expected to use a naval version of the Type 03 Chū-SAM.

Construction and career
Noshiro was laid down on 15 July 2020 at Mitsubishi Heavy Industries, Nagasaki and launched on 22 June 2021. She was commissioned on 15 December 2022.

References

External links 

2021 ships
Ships built by Mitsubishi Heavy Industries
Mogami-class frigates